Garra litanensis is a species of ray-finned fish in the genus Garra known from a single stream in the north-eastern Indian state of Manipur.

References 

Garra
Fish described in 1993